Johan Kriek defeated Steve Denton in the final, 6–2, 7–6(7–1), 6–7(1–7), 6–4 to win the men's singles tennis title at the 1981 Australian Open.

Brian Teacher was the defending champion, but did not compete this year.

Seeds
The seeded players are listed below. Johan Kriek is the champion; others show the round in which they were eliminated.

  Guillermo Vilas (third round)
  Peter McNamara (quarterfinals)
  Roscoe Tanner (second round)
  Johan Kriek (champion)
  Kim Warwick (quarterfinals)
  Mark Edmondson (semifinals)
  Fritz Buehning (first round)
  Tim Mayotte (quarterfinals)
  Shlomo Glickstein (quarterfinals)
  John Sadri (first round)
  Chris Lewis (third round)
  Hank Pfister (semifinals)
  Pat DuPré (third round)
  Kevin Curren (second round)
  Peter Rennert (second round)
  John Fitzgerald (first round)

Qualifying

Draw

Key
 Q = Qualifier
 WC = Wild card
 LL = Lucky loser
 r = Retired

Final eight

Section 1

Section 2

Section 3

Section 4

External links
 Association of Tennis Professionals (ATP) – 1981 Australian Open Men's Singles draw
 1981 Australian Open – Men's draws and results at the International Tennis Federation

Mens singles
Australian Open (tennis) by year – Men's singles